Hans Wagner (born Zurich, Switzerland; 1905-1989) was an ophthalmologist, and was the first to describe people who suffered from degenerative hyaloidea-retinalis hereditaria. L. Jansen, a Dutch ophthalmologist, suggested in 1966 that the disease be named after his Swiss colleague.

External links
Website for patients, doctors and researchers dealing with Wagner syndrome

References
Wagner, H.: Ein bisher ungekanntes Erbleiden des Auges (Degeneration hyalideo-retinalis hereditaria), beobachtet im Kanton Zürich, Klin, MBL. Augenheilk. 100 (1938), 840

1905 births
1989 deaths
Swiss ophthalmologists
20th-century Swiss physicians